Stojan Belaić (born 17 April 1969) is a retired footballer who played as a defender for clubs in Croatia, Austria, Portugal, Germany, Switzerland and Greece.

Club career
Born in Rijeka, Belajić began playing football with local side HNK Rijeka in the Yugoslav First League. He would play for Rijeka for several seasons, making 107 league appearances for the club.

Belajić moved to Austria in July 1996, playing for FK Austria Wien for two seasons. Spells with U.D. Leiria of the Portuguese Liga, FC Energie Cottbus of the German second division and Swiss side FC Luzern followed.

He moved to Greece in July 1999, where he would play for Greek first division side Apollon Smyrni F.C., making 28 appearances in the Greek top flight.

He returned to Switzerland in July 2000, and finished his career with Luzern.

Statistics

Player

Honours
Energie Cottbus
Brandenburg Cup: 1998

References

External links
 
 Profile at Austria Wien Archive 
 

1969 births
Living people
Footballers from Rijeka
Association football defenders
Yugoslav footballers
Croatian footballers
HNK Rijeka players
FK Austria Wien players
U.D. Leiria players
FC Energie Cottbus players
FC Luzern players
Apollon Smyrnis F.C. players
Yugoslav First League players
Croatian Football League players
Austrian Football Bundesliga players
Primeira Liga players
2. Bundesliga players
Super League Greece players
Croatian expatriate footballers
Expatriate footballers in Austria
Croatian expatriate sportspeople in Austria
Expatriate footballers in Portugal
Croatian expatriate sportspeople in Portugal
Expatriate footballers in Germany
Croatian expatriate sportspeople in Germany
Expatriate footballers in Switzerland
Croatian expatriate sportspeople in Greece